The 2012 Abyan offensive was an offensive by the Yemeni military against Islamist militant forces, possibly including elements of Al-Qaeda in the Arabian Peninsula (AQAP), in the province of Abyan with the purpose of re-capturing the militant-held towns of Zinjibar and Jaʿār.

On 12 May, the military started the offensive in an attempt to recapture all areas of Abyan out of their control. Over a month of fighting, 567 people were reportedly killed, including 429 Islamist fighters, 78 soldiers, 26 tribal fighters and 34 civilians. On 12 June the Yemeni army succeeded in retaking Zinjibar and Jaar, pushing the militants away after heavy clashes in and around both towns. The city of Shuqrah fell on 15 June, and militants retreated towards neighboring Shabwah Governorate.

Early advances
Over 19 and 20 May, 19 soldiers and 33 militants were killed in fighting in Ja'ar.

On the evening of 23 May, militants conducted a counter-attack in the region of Wadi Bani, west of Ja'ar, during which 33-35 militant fighters and nine soldiers were killed. A military official stated that though the army was making progress in its advance on Ja'ar, "it was facing resistance" from the militants. Earlier in the day, the military managed to advance into northeastern neighbourhoods of Zinjibar. Although managing to capture several buildings on the outskirts, they were being harassed by militant snipers.

On 26 May, the military pressed on with its offensive in Zinjibar, recapturing key positions in the Maraqid and Mashqasa districts on the outskirts of the city. The military stated 62 militant fighters were killed during the day while they suffered four dead and four wounded. 20 of the rebels were killed in the ground fighting and around 30 were killed when they were bombed by warplanes while trying to flee the area in pick-up trucks. Most of the dead militants were reportedly Somalis. Troops had also found the bodies of 25 militants killed in earlier clashes. At the same time, in Ja'ar, a roadside bomb destroyed a military vehicle on the outskirts of the town killing eight soldiers. Seven militants were killed in the fighting there.

On 31 May, fighting was reported on the northern and western outskirts of Ja'ar where troops, backed up by local tribal fighters, assaulted militant positions. An air strike also hit an AQAP communications centre in the town of Shaqra, east of Ja'ar.

Fighting intensifies
In fighting on 2 June, three militant rockets hit the headquarters of the 25th Mechanised Brigade, killing one soldier and wounding six others.

On 3 June, after securing the outskirts of Zinjibar, the military moved into the central part of the city where heavy fighting ensued with the militants in the city center. At the same time, troops fought Islamist fighters on the western edge of Jaar.

On 4 June, the military was closing in on the militant-held town of Shaqra, 50 km (30 miles) along the coast east of Zinjibar. Militant forces in the town were reportedly preparing for a fight.

On 11 June, warplanes bombed areas to the north and the west of Jaar and the Army attacked a hilltop munitions factory overlooking the town. After hours of fighting the Army captured the factory. Fighting was also reported in the nearby town of Shaqra.

Recapture of Zinjibar, Ja'ar and Shuqrah
On 12 June the Yemeni army succeeded in retaking Zinjibar and Jaar, pushing the militants away after heavy clashes in and around both towns. At least 28 casualties were reported, all but two of them being insurgents. Local residents reported vehicles carrying armed men, weapons and furniture heading east towards Shuqrah. The militants reportedly distributed pamphlets in Jaar apologising to residents for dragging the town into a conflict with the army and for the damage caused by the fighting. The governor of Abyan Governorate Jamal al-Aqel estimated that about 200-300 militants, including senior leaders and foreign fighters, had fled east and were being pursued by government forces. The Army reopened the main road between Jaar and Aden and vehicles could travel to the port for the first time in more than a year. The Defence Ministry said on its website that the Yemeni Navy had sunk 10 boats in which the militants had been planning to flee Shuqrah if needed.

After two days of heavy battles the Army reported regaining control of Shuqrah on 15 June. At least 57 militants were confirmed killed, with most of the rest fleeing to Shabwah Governorate and the city of Azzan, one of the last urban strongholds of the militants. The adjacent province also saw intense fighting, with reports indicating at least 23 insurgents died on 14 June during clashes at gas facilities near Belhaf. Government forces have not yet announced their own casualty figures, as well as the civilian toll.

On 17 June, AQAP peacefully withdrew from Azzan following mediation by local tribal leaders. However, the following day, the Army general leading the assault against the militants, General Salem Ali Qatan, was killed in the port city of Aden by a suicide bomber. Two soldiers were killed in the attack and twelve people sustained injuries.

Aftermath
In the weeks after the recapture of the main population centers there were no reported incidents. The first major attack was on 1 August, when a group of around 20 militants attacked a police station in the former insurgent stronghold of Jaʿār, killing four officers and injuring another. Three days later, a suicide bomber killed at least 45 people and injured more than 40 others during a funeral service in Jaar. Military officials and residents said the bomber targeted tribesmen who sided with the Yemeni army during an offensive against Islamist fighters that the government hailed as a major victory in June. Abyan remained quiet for the following weeks, despite major attacks by AQAP against the central intelligence building in Aden on 18 August, as well as the convoy of Yemeni Defense Minister Gen. Mohammed Nasser Ahmed in the heart of the capital Sana'a. The latter blast came one day after the government announced the death of AQAP number-two operative Said al-Shihri in a US drone strike. On 16 October a suicide bomber killed six local militia members at a checkpoint outside the city of Mudya in Abyan. On 19 October militants set off a car bomb at an army base in Abyan Governorate, sparking a heavy firefight with security forces. Sixteen soldiers and 8 militants were killed during the raid, while at least 29 soldiers were injured. A suicide bombing at a militia office in Zinjibar killed at least three on 16 November.

In the beginning of December Amnesty International released a report on the fighting, accusing both sides in the conflict of "horrific" rights abuses and calling for an impartial government probe into events on the ground. According to the report, Islamic militants had set up their own courts and carried out "public summary killings, crucifixion, amputation and flogging". Ansar al-Sharia also "used residential areas as a base of operations, particularly in Jaar, thus exposing civilians to harm. The London-based watchdog also accused Yemeni government troops of using air strikes, artillery and mortars to indiscriminately bombard civilian areas, resulting in scores of casualties, including many children.

On 31 January 2013, clashes broke out between Yemeni Army units and suspected militants in al-Maraksha, Abyan Governorate. By 2 February the government forces had successfully pushed the insurgents out of the town, killing 12 of them. At least 5 Yemeni soldiers and local militia members were also killed during the fighting. According to local sources, the militants moved to East Anwar, about 80 km from the regional capital Zinjibar.

2015–2016 fall and recapture

Al-Qaeda's fighters stormed Jaar and Zinjibar in early December 2015 and recaptured the towns, later declaring them "Emirates", providing civilian services, and establishing a Sharia court.  In summer 2016 Yemeni government forces backed by Arab coalition aircraft and gunboats moved to retake the towns, and despite encountering "repeated suicide attacks" drove AQAP out of Zinjibar on 14 August 2016.

References

Conflicts in 2012
Battles involving Yemen
2012 in Yemen
2012 offensive
May 2012 events in Asia
June 2012 events in Asia